In topology, a clopen set (a portmanteau of closed-open set) in a topological space is a set which is both open and closed. A set is closed if its complement is open, which leaves the possibility of an open set whose complement is also open, making both sets both open  closed, and therefore clopen. This contrast to doors gave the class of topological spaces known as "door spaces" their name.

Examples 

In any topological space  the empty set and the whole space  are both clopen.

Now let  be an infinite set under the discrete metricthat is, two points  have distance 1 if they're not the same point, and 0 otherwise. Under the resulting metric space, any singleton set is open; hence any set, being the union of single points, is open. Since any set is open, the complement of any set is open too, and therefore any set is closed. So, all sets in this metric space are clopen.

As a less trivial example, consider the space  of all rational numbers with their ordinary topology, and the set  of all positive rational numbers whose square is bigger than 2.

Properties 

 A topological space  is connected if and only if the only clopen sets are the empty set and  itself.
 A set is clopen if and only if its boundary is empty.
 Any clopen set is a union of (possibly infinitely many) connected components.
 A topological space  is discrete if and only if all of its subsets are clopen.
 Using the union and intersection as operations, the clopen subsets of a given topological space  form a Boolean algebra.  Boolean algebra can be obtained in this way from a suitable topological space: see Stone's representation theorem for Boolean algebras.

See also

Notes

References 

  
 

General topology